is a retired Japanese athlete who specialised in the high hurdles. She represented her country at two consecutive Summer Olympics starting in 1996.

She was born in Shinjuku, Tokyo to a Japanese mother and a Jamaican father. She grew up in Sacramento.

She has personal bests of 13.00 seconds in the 100 metres hurdles (2000) and 8.12 seconds in the indoor 60 metres hurdles (1999). Both are current national records.

She is married to Larry Wade, another former professional hurdler and she has two sons (Jordan and Brandon). She is the head coach for sprints, hurdles and relays for the UNLV Rebels at the University of Las Vegas.

Competition record

References

1974 births
Living people
People from Shinjuku
Athletes from Tokyo
Japanese female hurdlers
Olympic female hurdlers
Olympic athletes of Japan
Athletes (track and field) at the 1996 Summer Olympics
Athletes (track and field) at the 2000 Summer Olympics
Asian Games competitors for Japan
Athletes (track and field) at the 1998 Asian Games
Athletes (track and field) at the 2002 Asian Games
World Athletics Championships athletes for Japan
Japan Championships in Athletics winners
Japanese people of American descent
Japanese people of Jamaican descent
20th-century Japanese women
21st-century Japanese women